Hennipman is a surname. Notable people with the surname include:

Pieter Hennipman (1911–1994), Dutch economist
Truus Hennipman (born 1943), Dutch athlete